Padri may refer to:

 Priest, used in addressing or referring to a priest or father
  reformists who fought against Minangkabau traditionalists in the Padri War
 Padri (film), Konkani language film
 anything of, from, or related to Padar, a region of Jammu and Kashmir, India
 Padri dialect, an Indo-Aryan dialect
 Padri, Iran, a village in Bushehr Province, Iran
 Kerala-no-dhoro (also known as Padri), an archaeological site in India

See also
 Padari (disambiguation)